Lucerne, also known as Catron Place, is a historic house on a former plantation in Brownsville, Tennessee, U.S.. It was built in 1855 by slaves for Peter Mosby. It became known as Catron Place in 1904, when it was acquired by the Catron family.

The house was designed in the Greek Revival architectural style. It has been listed on the National Register of Historic Places since December 23, 1977.

References

National Register of Historic Places in Fayette County, Tennessee
Greek Revival architecture in Tennessee
Houses completed in 1855
Plantation houses in Tennessee